Crescencia Valls Espí (Onteniente, 9 June 1863 – Canals, 26 September 1936) was a Spanish Catholic embroiderer who was murdered during the Spanish Civil War. She was beatified by Pope John Paul II on 11 March 2001.

Life 
Crescencia was born in Onteniente, Spain to Joaquín Valls and Francisca Espí and baptized on 10 June 1863 in the parish church of Santa Maria. She received a basic education at the school of the Daughters of Charity of San Vicente de Paúl in Onteniente. A devout Catholic, she became an embroiderer, working at home to help support her family. She belonged to several charitable Catholic associations: Women of Saint Vincent de Paul, the Apostleship of Prayer and the Third Order of the Virgen del Carmen.

In its documents to support beatification, the Archdiocese of Valencia called Crescencia a "Servant of God" and a "social apostle" and described her charitable work.A social apostle, she exercised charity visiting the sick. She asked wealthy people for financial aid in order to help the needs of the poor. Likewise, immensely charitable, she was moved and suffered by people's pains. For families who had a deceased person, she helped them pay burial expenses and consoled them in their grief.With the start of the Spanish Civil War in 1936, numerous massacres took place and, according to documents from the Archdiocese of Valencia, Crescencia knew what to expect: "The Servant of God, in the days before the revolution, was aware of the situation she was about to face: religious persecution and probable martyrdom."  

Soon Crescencia was officially labeled a "Fervent Catholic" by the mayor of Onteniente, who denounced her to the governor of Valencia. On 26 September 1936, citing her collaborations with religious organizations and advocacy of Catholicism, militiamen broke into her house shortly before noon and arrested her together with her three sisters Concepción, Carmen and Patrocinio. They were taken to the port of Canals and finally, after about 12 hours of imprisonment, all four sisters were murdered, shot in the neck. 

At first, her body was deposited with other martyrs in a common grave in the Canals cemetery, but her remains were later exhumed and interred at her hometown church, the Asunción de Nuestra Señora de Onteniente. 

Officials at the Archdiocese of Valencia promoted Crescencia's beatification because of her dedication to faith. She was beatified by Pope John Paul II on 11 March 2001 as one of 232 Spanish martyrs.

References 

   

1863 births
1936 deaths
19th-century venerated Christians
20th-century Roman Catholics
People from Valencia
Beatifications by Pope John Paul II
Spanish beatified people
People executed by Spain by firearm
Spanish embroiderers